Kamenka is an urban locality (an urban-type settlement) and the administrative center of Kamensky District of Voronezh Oblast, Russia. Population:

History
It was founded in 1750 as a farm by the Cossacks of the Ostrogozhsky Cossack regiment. A railway station was built in 1871. When the Communists arrived in December 1919 they established the Kamensky Volis Executive Committee. In 1920 hundreds of people died of starvation after the government seized much of the harvest. The status of the urban settlement was obtained in 1937.

References

Urban-type settlements in Voronezh Oblast